This is a list of electricity-generating power stations in the U.S. state of Texas, sorted by type and name. In 2019, Texas had a total summer capacity of 125,117 MW through all of its power plants, and a net generation of 483,201 GWh.  The corresponding electrical energy generation mix was 53.5% natural gas, 19.0% coal, 17.3% wind, 8.6% nuclear, 0.9% solar, 0.3% hydroelectric, 0.3% biomass, and 0.1% other sources. Small-scale photovoltaic installations generated an additional net 1,001 GWh to the Texas electrical grid in 2019, less than one-quarter the amount generated by the state's utility-scale facilities.

Texas produces and consumes far more electrical energy than any other U.S. state.   It generates almost twice as much electricity as the next highest generating state, Florida.  Texas has an expanding variety of generating sources to meet consumption growth. Installed wind capacity grew to 28,800 MW and solar capacity grew to 3,100 MW at the end of 2019.  Wind generation exceeded nuclear in 2014, and was near to surpassing coal in the number two position in 2019. Fossil-fuel and nuclear generation has remained nearly constant over the past two decades, with natural gas gradually replacing coal.

Texas oil extraction operations in year 2019 included the flaring of 250 billion cubic feet of associated petroleum gas, with much of it concentrated in the Permian basin near Midland.   This amount of wasted natural gas could have met all of the state's residential heating and cooking needs, or could have generated an amount of electrical energy nearly equal to the state's 40,000 GWh of nuclear generation.

Nuclear power stations

Fossil-fuel power stations
Data from the U.S. Energy Information Administration serves as a general reference.

Coal and lignite
A useful map of coal generation plants is provided by the Sierra Club.

Defunct

Natural gas
Data from U.S. Energy Information Administration.
Additional data sources:

Defunct

Renewable power stations
Data from the U.S. Energy Information Administration serves as a general reference.

Biomass

Defunct

Hydroelectric dams

Wind farms

The following list emphasizes operating wind farms in Texas that are 100 MW or larger.

Solar farms

The following list emphasizes operating solar photovoltaic farms in Texas that are 20 MW or larger.

Utility companies

Vistra Energy (formerly Energy Future Holdings) (includes Luminant and TXU)
Oncor Electric Delivery
NRG Energy includes Reliant Energy, Green Mountain Energy
 CenterPoint
AEP (American Electric Power)
Austin Energy*
Calpine
CPS Energy*
El Paso Electric
Entergy, Texas (Formerly Gulf States Utilities) Is a separate subsidiary of Entergy Corporation
Lubbock Power and Light*
Lower Colorado River Authority*
Luminant
Panda Energy International
Quanta Services
Pedernales Electric Cooperative
Bailey County Electric Cooperative
Bandera Electric Cooperative
Bartlett Electric Cooperative
Big Country Electric Cooperative
Bluebonnet Electric Cooperative
Bowie-Cass Electric Cooperative
Brazos Electric Cooperative
Bryan Texas Utilities (BTU)
Central Texas Electric Cooperative
Cherokee County Electric Cooperative Association
Coleman County Electric Cooperative
Comanche Electric Cooperative Association
Concho Valley Electric Cooperative
Cooke County Electric Cooperative Association
CoServ Electric
Deaf Smith Electric Cooperative
Deep East Texas Electric Cooperative
East Texas Electric Cooperative
Fannin County Electric Cooperative
Farmers Electric Cooperative
Fayette Electric Cooperative
Federated Rural Electric Insurance Exchange
Fort Belknap Electric Cooperative
Golden Spread Electric Cooperative
Grayson-Collin Electric Cooperative
Greenbelt Electric Cooperative
Guadalupe Valley Electric Cooperative
Hamilton County Electric Cooperative Association
Harmon Electric
Heart of Texas Electric Cooperative
HILCO Electric Cooperative
Houston County Electric Cooperative
J-A-C Electric Cooperative
Jackson Electric Cooperative
Jasper-Newton Electric Cooperative
Karnes Electric Cooperative
Lamar County Electric Cooperative Association
Lamb County Electric Cooperative
Lea County Electric Cooperative
Lighthouse Electric Cooperative
Lyntegar Electric Cooperative
Magic Valley Electric Cooperative
Medina Electric Cooperative
MidSouth Electric Cooperative
Navarro County Electric Cooperative
Navasota Valley Electric Cooperative
North Plains Electric Cooperative
Northeast Texas Electric Cooperative
Nueces Electric Cooperative
Panola-Harrison Electric Cooperative
Rayburn Country Electric Cooperative
Rio Grande Electric Cooperative
Rita Blanca Electric Cooperative
Rusk County Electric Cooperative
Sam Houston Electric Cooperative
San Bernard Electric Cooperative
San Miguel Electric Cooperative
San Patricio Electric Cooperative
South Plains Electric Cooperative
South Texas Electric Cooperative
Southwest Arkansas Electric Cooperative
Southwest Rural Electric Association
Southwest Texas Electric Cooperative
Swisher Electric Cooperative
Taylor Electric Cooperative
Tri-County Electric Cooperative
Trinity Valley Electric Cooperative
United Cooperative Services
Upshur Rural Electric Cooperative
Victoria Electric Cooperative
Western Farmers Electric Cooperative
Wharton County Electric Cooperative
Wise Electric Cooperative
Wood County Electric Cooperative

* public utility
Touchstone Energy
National Rural Electric Cooperative Association

Other energy-related companies in Texas
 Enbridge
 Enel Green Power
 Foster Wheeler
 Southwestern Energy
 Texas Energy Engineers

See also

 February 13–16, 2021 North American winter storm

References

External links

U.S. Department of Energy Texas Statistics
U.S. Department of Energy Texas Quick Facts
Texas Public Utility Commission: New Electric Generating Plants
Blue Wing Solar Farm Info
Assessing climate sensitivity of peak electricity load for resilient power systems planning and operation: A study applied to the Texas region

Power stations
 
Texas